Benjamin Walter David Lovett (born 30 September 1986) is a British musician and producer, best known for being a member of the Grammy Award-winning British folk rock band Mumford & Sons.

Music career

Mumford and Sons
Lovett is one of the founding members of the band Mumford & Sons. He attended Hallfield School in Birmingham before moving to London. Later, he attended King's College School in Wimbledon which he attended with Marcus Mumford. He met fellow band members, Ted Dwane and Winston Marshall, in London. He primarily plays keyboard and piano within the group, but also sings backing vocals and plays accordion, drums, guitar and percussion on the group's songs.

The band has four full-length studio albums, Sigh No More (2009), which earned them a number of Grammy Awards nominations in 2010 and 2011 and won the Brit Award for Best British Album in 2011, and Babel (2012) which won the band the Grammy Award for Album of the Year, their third album, Wilder Mind, released in May 2015, and Delta, released in November 2018. In 2013 the group won the Brit Award for Best British Group.

Other musical ventures
In the early days of Mumford & Sons, Lovett produced albums for folk bands around London, including Peggy Sue.

Lovett produced on Ellie Goulding's critically acclaimed 2010 album Lights, including Goulding's cover of the Elton John track "Your Song" which peaked at no. 2 on the singles chart. As well as being credited as a producer on the album, Lovett is also credited with playing kick drum, piano and singing backing vocals on the release, which debuted at no. 1 on the UK album charts. Lovett has previously joined Goulding on stage to play piano on "Your Song" and the pair have recorded duets of Service Bell by Feist and Grizzly Bear and Two Dancers by Wild Beasts, which Lovett aired whilst presenting on Triple J radio.

Lovett also assisted the production of the self-titled debut solo album of former Felice Brothers member Simon Felice throughout 2011. Lovett was credited as a producer on the release and also featured as a guest on the lead single from the album, "You & I Belong".

Lovett is the co-founder of record label and live music promotion team, Communion. The aim of the label is to create a "platform for an unsigned music scene in the main cities". The label has showcased and released the music of a number of notable artists, including Gotye, Michael Kiwanuka, Foy Vance and Ben Howard.

Personal life
Lovett publicly announced his engagement to his long time girlfriend, fashion designer Jemima Janney, on 20 July 2014. They married in 2015 and divorced in late 2016. During Mumford and Sons' promo for their 4th album, "Delta", he described the album as “the four Ds: death, divorce, drugs and depression".

He's in a romantic relationship with the co-founder and CEO of American brand La Ligne Molly Howard, referring to her as his girlfriend in a post on Facebook. On 5 June 2021, Howard announced on Instagram that she had given birth to the couple’s first child, a daughter named Isadora Blue Lovett.

References

English folk singers
English keyboardists
English male singers
Grammy Award winners
Living people
Mumford & Sons members
People educated at King's College School, London
People from Wimbledon, London
1986 births
21st-century English singers
21st-century British male singers